Lande is a village in the municipality of Brønnøy in Nordland county, Norway. The village is an old church site, and currently the location of Tosen Chapel.

References

Villages in Nordland
Brønnøy